The 2008 Telstra Australian Swimming Championships were held at the Sydney Olympic Park Aquatic Centre in Sydney, New South Wales, Australia from 22–29 March 2008. The championships were used as the Australian trials for the 2008 Olympic Games squad.

Like all previous Australian swimming trials, the championships program mirrored the 2008 Olympic swimming program with the addition of the non-Olympic events – 50 m backstroke, breaststroke and butterfly; 800 m freestyle (men) and 1500 m freestyle (women).

Results
Highlighted swimmers achieved the qualification conditions to be included in the Olympic team in that respective event.

Men's events

Women's events

Olympic team news

Due to strong performances, two additional members were added to the Australian Olympic swim team: Nick Ffrost and Felicity Galvez both finished seventh in their 200 m freestyle events. Additionally, Galvez finished third in the women's 200 m butterfly. It is assumed Galvez will swim the heat of the 4×100 m medley relay with Libby Trickett likely to swim the freestyle leg, elevating Jessicah Schipper into the butterfly position. This however has created controversy with freestyler Andrew Mewing appealing his non-selection after finishing 8th with an A qualifying time, whilst Galvez was selected via a B qualifying time, that ranked her 9th in the 200 m freestyle. Mewing lost his appeal with the Court of Arbitration for Sport. Adam Lucas finished second in both the 200 m and 400 m individual medley events, but was not selected because he swam a B qualifying time, rather than an A qualifying time. These are the only events on the Australian roster that remain without a second qualifier.

Melissa Gorman failed to meet the qualification time for the 800 m freestyle at the championships themselves, however was included in the team to swim this event after qualifying for the 10 km marathon swimming event.

During the early hours of 30 March 2008, Nick D'Arcy was involved in an altercation with a fellow Australia swimmer, Simon Cowley. Cowley was a winner of three gold medals at the 1998 Commonwealth Games. D'Arcy is now facing possible expulsion from the 2008 Olympic team. In his own decision, D'Arcy withdrew from the upcoming 2008 World Short Course Championships. He has been charged with assault occasioning grievous bodily harm.

See also
 2008 in swimming

References
 

Australian Swimming Championships
Australian
Swimming Championships
Sports competitions in Sydney
2000s in Sydney